Land of Bad is an upcoming American action thriller film directed by Will Eubank, who co-wrote the script with David Frigerio.  The film stars Russell Crowe and Liam Hemsworth.

Premise 
Reaper, a USAF drone pilot, provides air support to a Delta Force team on the ground in the Philippines.  After a mishap, Kinney, a young JTAC officer finds himself part of an extraction team relying only on Reaper's remote air support.

Cast 
 Russell Crowe as Reaper
 Liam Hemsworth as Kinney
 Milo Ventimiglia as Captain Sugar
 Luke Hemsworth as Sergeant Abel
 Ricky Whittle
 Daniel MacPherson
 Chika Ikogwe
 George Burgess as Private Cooper

Production 
The film, written by David Frigerio and Will Eubank—with Eubank also directing, was first announced at the 2022 Cannes Film Market. Russell Crowe and Liam Hemsworth were the first cast members attached to the film.  In September 2022, additional casting announcements added Milo Ventimiglia, Luke Hemsworth, Ricky Whittle, Daniel MacPherson, and Chika Ikogwe. George Burgess was brought to the cast by Crowe.

Filming began in September 2022, running through November 2022 in the Gold Coast, Queensland.  The production took advantage of location incentives offered by the Australian government, bringing roughly 270 to its local film industry.

References

External links 
 

2020s action thriller films
American action thriller films
Films directed by William Eubank
Films shot on the Gold Coast, Queensland
Upcoming English-language films